Accidental Meeting is a 1936 Soviet action comedy film directed and written by Igor Savchenko.

Plot 
Cute coach Gregory falls in love with his athlete Irina and this is mutual. Grigory dreams of fame, and Irina in turn wants to give him a son.

Starring 
 Galina Pashkova as Irina
 Yevgeny Samoylov as Grigoriy Rybin (as E. V. Samoylov)
 Pyotr Savin as Pyotr Ivanovich (as P. N. Savin)
 Ivan Lobyzovskiy as Petya Solovyov, aka Pyatak (as I. A. Solovyov)
 Konstantin Nassonov as The Factory director (as K. A. Nasonov)
 Sergey Nikonov as The driver (as S. N. Nikonov)
 Valentina Ivashova as Tanya (as V. Ivasheva)

References

External links 

1936 films
1930s Russian-language films
Soviet black-and-white films
Soviet action comedy films
1930s action comedy films
1936 comedy films